Benjamin "Tony" Atkins  (August 26, 1968 – September 17, 1997), also known as The Woodward Corridor Killer, was an American serial killer and rapist who murdered, tortured, and raped 11 women in Highland Park and Detroit, Michigan, during a period of eight months between December 1991 and August 1992.

Early life
Benjamin 'Tony' Atkins was born on August 26, 1968, in Detroit, the younger of two sons. His family lived in a poor neighborhood, and both of his parents were drug and alcohol abusers. Shortly after his birth, Tony's father left the family. In 1970, Benjamin's mother abandoned him and he wound up in an orphanage, where he spent his childhood and youth. While living there, he was physically assaulted by other children, and at the age of 10, was raped by one of the employees. Over the next five years, he was continuously subjected to sexual harassment by other boys, until he eventually escaped and reunited with his mother. For some time, he lived together with her and his older brother, but one day, Tony realised that his mother worked as a prostitute. Due to this, both Atkins and his brother saw her have sex with clients at the house on several occasions. 

Disgusted with his mother's actions, he left the house again in the late 1980s, living on the streets and doing drugs, and eventually developed a drug addiction. Because he lacked formal education, Atkins was forced to work in low-skilled labor jobs for low wages, and spent the nights at homeless shelters. In his free time, he frequented places inhabited by pimps and prostitutes, but was never arrested for any serious crimes. Most of his acquaintances claimed to be very fond of him, but at the same time noted that when drunk or on drugs, he showed signs of an antisocial personality and displayed misogynistic behavior.

Murders
As victims, Atkins chose young and middle-aged destitute women, often prostitutes or drug addicts. He would lure them to abandoned buildings where he sexually assaulted them. After strangling his victims, he would leave the bodies at the crime scenes, with some of them discovered months after their deaths. 

The first victim to be discovered was 30-year-old Debbie Ann Friday, found on December 14, 1991, after she had gone missing on December 8.  

On December 30, the body of 26-year-old Bertha Jean Mason was found. She had gone missing on December 11 and was last seen leaving her home and entering a store, after which she was never seen alive again.  

On January 3, 1992, while demolishing an abandoned house, workmen discovered the body of 36-year-old Patricia Cannon George, who had been put on a wanted list in early December 1991 following a drug den bust within Woodward Corridor. 

On January 25, the body of 39-year-old Vickie Truelove was located: like the other victims, she had been sexually assaulted and strangled. At the end of January, Atkins was arrested at an abandoned building and taken to the police station for interrogation. Due to a lack of evidence to prove his guilt in the murders, he was released.  

On February 17, the corpses of three women were found in three separate rooms in the former Monterey Hotel in Highland Park: they were 34-year-old Valerie Chalk, 23-year-old Juanita Hardy and a Jane Doe whose identity remains unknown. Relatives of Chalk told police she went missing after she was put on a wanted list in early November 1991. 

On April 9, the body of 28-year-old Brenda Mitchell was found in an abandoned house, after she had gone missing four days earlier with her two kids to go to the store. Mitchell was found almost completely naked, except for a scarf wrapped around her neck. Her death was initially believed to be a drug overdose. 

A few days later, on the 15th, the partially decomposed corpse of 27-year-old Vicki Beasley-Brown, who was last seen alive on March 25, was discovered. 

On June 15, the body of 45-year-old Joanne O'Rourke was found.

Arrest
Atkins was arrested on rape charges on August 21, 1992, after he was identified on a Detroit street by 34-year-old Darlene Saunders, who had been sexually assaulted by him in October 1991. He categorically denied any involvement in the murders, claiming that he had no interest in women and was a homosexual. After further interrogations, the police officers familiarized him with the psychological portrait they had compiled of the killer. After 12 hours, Atkins admitted to the murders of 11 women. He described in detail the appearance and clothing of the victims, and even indicated the whereabouts of the 10th and 11th victims, 21-year-old Ocinena Waymer and 29-year-old LaTanya Showanda Smith. Their disappearances were not connected to the murders until Atkins' confession, and the bodies were found on the indicated place that same day.

During the interrogation, Atkins said that the motive for the murders was his misogynistic views against girls and women engaged in prostitution. He stated that he lured his victims into abandoned houses by offering them drugs and alcohol, in addition to paying for their sexual services.

Contrary to the official version of the investigation, Tony revealed that the first victim had actually been Patricia George, whom he killed in the fall of 1991.

Since no physical evidence could be found to incriminate him, Atkins was charged solely based on Saunders' testimony and his own confession.

Trial
The trial began in January 1994. Around 150 people, including relatives of Atkins' victims, appeared as witnesses for the prosecution at the court hearings. At one of the hearings, Atkins readily confessed to the murders, but claimed to be insane. For the majority of the trial, he didn't react in any way to what was happening and appeared to be isolating himself from the proceedings. His lawyer demanded leniency towards his client, on the grounds that Atkins had been abused as a child. According to the lawyer, the psychological trauma, coupled with drug addiction, eventually led to his mental, emotional and behavioral problems. However, after a four-month trial and three days of deliberations, the jury found Benjamin Atkins guilty, and in April of that year, he was sentenced to several life imprisonment terms.

Death
After his conviction, Atkins was transferred to the Charles Egeler Reception and Guidance Center in Jackson, but due to health issues, he was quickly transferred to Duane Waters Hospital, where he died on September 17, 1997, from an AIDS-related illness.

See also 
 List of homicides in Michigan
 List of serial killers in the United States
 List of serial killers by number of victims

References

External links 
 Detroit Serial Killer | Benjamin Atkins book written by Al Profit
 Serial Killer: Benjamin Tony Atkins aka Woodward Corridor Killer at mylifeofcrime.wordpress.com
 
 

1968 births
1991 murders in the United States
1997 deaths
20th-century American criminals
AIDS-related deaths in Michigan
American male criminals
American people convicted of murder
American people convicted of rape
American people who died in prison custody
American prisoners sentenced to life imprisonment
American rapists
American serial killers
Crimes against sex workers in the United States
Criminals from Michigan
Highland Park, Michigan
Male serial killers
People convicted of murder by Michigan
People with antisocial personality disorder
Prisoners sentenced to life imprisonment by Michigan
Prisoners who died in Michigan detention
Serial killers who died in prison custody
Violence against women in the United States